Torge Hollmann (born 28 January 1982) is a German former professional footballer who played as a defender.

Career
Hollmann was born in Löningen. He made his debut on the professional league level in the Bundesliga for SC Freiburg on 16 October 2004 when he came on as a substitute in the 81st minute in a game against 1. FC Nürnberg.

In June 2012 he agreed the termination of his contract with SV Wehen Wiesbaden.

References

Living people
1982 births
Association football defenders
German footballers
SC Freiburg players
SV Wehen Wiesbaden players
SV Eintracht Trier 05 players
Bundesliga players
2. Bundesliga players
3. Liga players